Buyina is a genus of Australian intertidal spiders first described by V. T. Davies in 1998.  it contains only two species.

References

Araneomorphae genera
Desidae
Spiders of Australia
Taxa named by Valerie Todd Davies